Jacksboro High School is a 3A high school located in Jacksboro, Texas (USA). It is part of the Jacksboro Independent School District located in central Jack County.  In 2011, the school was rated "Academically Acceptable" by the Texas Education Agency.

Athletics
The Jacksboro Tigers compete in the following sports:

Cross Country, Volleyball, Football, Basketball, Golf, Track, Softball & Baseball

State Titles
Football -
1962(2A), 1971(2A)
Boys Golf -
1963(2A), 1965(2A), 1967(2A), 1968(2A), 2005(2A)
Spirit- (3A) 2020, 2022, 2023

References

External links
 Jacksboro ISD

Schools in Jack County, Texas
Public high schools in Texas